The Clouds (also called just Clouds) are an indie rock band from Sydney, Australia formed in December 1989. The core of the group consisted of frontwomen Jodi Phillis (guitar and vocals) and Patricia "Trish" Young (bass and vocals). The line-up of The Clouds has changed several times with different drummers and lead guitarists. The Clouds' music is distinguished by rapid and unusual chord changes, creative bass guitar, and Phillis and Young's vocal harmonies. They released 4 albums and numerous EPs and singles before breaking up in 1997. They reformed in 2011.

History

1989-1993: Penny Century, Octopus & Thunderhead
The Clouds were one of Australia's most promising acts in the late 1980s and early 1990s, along with other up-and-comers like Ratcat, Falling Joys, Tall Tales and True and The Hummingbirds.

The Clouds secured a recording contract with Red Eye Records in 1990 and began recording their debut EP in May which was released in October, titled Cloud Factory. The EP peaked at number 118 on the ARIA charts In April 1991, they released the EP Loot, featuring the song "Soul Eater". Loot peaked at number 22 on the ARIA chart.

In mid 1991, recording for the Penny Century album began. The album was released in October 1991, and peaked at number 23 on the ARIA Chart. It spawned the singles "Hieronymous" and "Anthem".

In September 1992, the band released "Say It", the lead single from their second studio album Octopus which was released in October 1992.
Octopus peaked at number 24 on the ARIA charts.

In June 1993,  recording began on the third album, Thunderhead. The lead single "Bower of Bliss" was released in August. Thunderhead was released in October, and peaked at number 30 on the ARIA chart. The second single, "Alchemy's Dead" was released in December.

1994-1999: Futura and break up
In 1994, Clouds took a six-month tour to Europe and the United States, securing an American record deal with Elektra Records. Whilst in London the EP Beetroot was recorded. It was released in Australia in October 1994 and peaked at number 65 on the ARIA chart.

Following the signing with Elektra Records Thunderhead was released in the United States in March 1995 along with numerous promotional singles. However, shortly after these releases The Clouds were dumped by Elektra. Despite this setback, recording of new songs continued and two singles were released in 1995, "Aquamarine" and "Panel Van" in August and November 1995, respectively.

In May 1996, Red Eye Records released a re-released Penny Century which included a limited edition bonus CD of early songs called Pre-Raphaelite. This helped the album to reach gold accreditation in Australia (35,000 copies sold).

In November 1996, the band released their fourth studio album Futura which peaked at number 50 on the ARIA chart. The group eventually disbanded in 1997.

In 1999, the compilation album Favourites was released.

2000-present: reformation 
Although Phillis was living in a small town in Tasmania and Young was living in London, the two occasionally reunited over the years to perform a few shows. Phillis went on to form The Dearhunters and Roger Loves Betty, and also records and performs as a solo artist.

In late 2005, Phillis and Young resurfaced under the name The Girls from the Clouds, releasing a 5-track EP titled Lalalala. In April 2007, however, the duo announced they had disbanded again.

The Clouds reunited to tour with Jesus Jones and The Wonder Stuff in August 2011. In late 2011 and early 2012, the band toured Australia in The Clouds Reunion Tour.

In February 2017, The Clouds released a new song, "Mabel's Bookshop" from an EP Zaffre, their first new music in 20 years.

They toured at the 2017 The Day on the Green with Blondie and Cyndi Lauper.

Members
Jodi Phillis – guitar, vocals (1989–1997, 2005–2006, 2011–present)
Trish Young – bass, vocals (1989–1997, 2005–2006, 2011–present)
Robert Phelan – guitar (1989–1990)
Stuart Eadie – drums (1989–1991)
Dave Easton – guitar (1990–1996, 2011–present)
Andrew Byrne – drums (1992)
Raphael Whittingham – drums (1993–1997, 2011–present)
Ben Nightingale – guitar (1996–1997)

Timeline

Discography

Studio albums

Compilation albums

Extended plays

Singles

Notes

Awards and nominations

ARIA Music Awards
The ARIA Music Awards is an annual awards ceremony that recognises excellence, innovation, and achievement across all genres of Australian music. They commenced in 1987.

! 
|-
|1992
| Penny Century
| ARIA Award for Breakthrough Artist - Album
| 
|
|-
|1994
| Thunderhead
| ARIA Award for Best Adult Alternative Album
| 
|
|-

References

Musical groups established in 1989
Musical groups disestablished in 1997
Musical groups reestablished in 2011
Australian indie rock groups
New South Wales musical groups